José Batres Montúfar  (1809–1844) was a Guatemalan poet, politician, engineer and military figure.

Monument 

In 1852, Juan Matheu and Manuel Francisco Pavón Aycinena presented Rafael Carrera with a plan to build a majestic National Theater, that would be called Carrera Theater in his honor.  Once approved, Carrera commissioned Matheu himself and Miguel Ruiz de Santisteban to build the theater. Initially it was in charge of engineer Miguel Rivera Maestre, but he quit after a few months and was replaced by German expert José Beckers, who built the Greek façades and added a lobby. This was the first monumental building ever built in the Republican era of Guatemala, given that in the 1850s the country finally was enjoying some peace and prosperity.

Appleton's Guide to México and Guatemala of 1884 describes the theater as follows: «In the middle of the square is the Theater, similar in size and elegance to any of the rest of Spanish America. Lines of orange trees and other nice trees of brilliant flowers and delicious fragrances surround the building while the statues and fountains placed at certain intervals enhance even more the beauty of the place.

After the Liberal reform from 1871, the theater was called National Theater.   In 1892, it was refurbished, removing the conservative Coat of Arms from its façade and substituting it with a sculpture and inscriptions. The orange trees, fountains and sculptures were removed, and in their place modern gardens were planted and a bust of Batres Montúfar was erected.

During the government of general Manuel Lisandro Barillas Bercián, the theater was remodeled to celebrate the Discovery of America fourth centennial anniversary; the Italian community in Guatemala donated a statue of Christopher Columbus -Cristóbal Colón, in Spanish- which was placed next to the theater.  Since then, the place was called «Colón Theater».

Literary works
Rubén Darío considers two of Batres' poems, Reloj, and Falsas apariencias, "little gems" of American literature.

References

Bibliography

 
 
 
 
 
  
 

1809 births
1844 deaths
Guatemalan politicians
19th-century Guatemalan people
19th-century Guatemalan poets
Guatemalan male poets
Rafael Carrera
19th-century male writers